Philippe B is a francophone singer-songwriter based in Montreal.

Biography
Born Philippe Bergeron in Rouyn-Noranda, Quebec, Canada, Philippe B is the former lead vocalist for Gwenwed.  He was also a session guitarist for Pierre Lapointe on his eponymous album. He released his first self-titled solo album in 2005 on label Proxenett Records. That same year he played at the Festival de musique emergente in Abitibi-Témiscamingue, where he also played the song Philadelphia for television show Mange ta ville. He then set off on a promotional tour in Québec, which ended in 2006 with a show at Les FrancoFolies de Montréal. He was also chosen to participate in the Sacré Talent event for Radio-Canada.

In 2008 he released his second album Taxidermie, also on Proxenett.

In 2009 Philippe B co-wrote two songs with Pierre Lapointe, Le bar des suicidés and À moi for the album Sentiments humains and also wrote two songs for Stéphanie Lapointe, each entitled Eau salée and Une fleur.

He came up with the musical conception pour the play Silence Radio, presented in fall 2009 at Espace libre in Montreal, before embarking on the promotional tour for Sentiments humains with Pierre Lapointe, with around 50 concert dates across Québec and France.

Philippe B received the grant for creation from the Conseil des arts et des lettres du Québec, to write new material for his third album.

In fall 2009, In collaboration with actress Sophie Cadieux, he also participated in the creation of a multi-disciplinary show (song, poetry, photography) entitled Phéromones, which was presented at the bistro in Vivo, in Montreal.

In 2014, Philippe B won the Félix award at L'ADISQ for songwriter of the year ("Auteur-compositeur de l'année").

Amongst all of his projects, Philippe B recorded Groenland's album The Chase along with Guido Del Fabbro, opened for headliner Mara Tremblay and has also played guitar and was music director of Salomé Leclerc.

In 2017, he released his fifth album titled La grande nuit vidéo, via Bonsound.

In 2019 he composed music for the film We Are Gold (Nous sommes Gold), receiving a Prix Iris nomination for Best Original Music at the 21st Quebec Cinema Awards.

Discography

Albums
2005:  Philippe B (Proxenett)
2008:  Taxidermie (Proxenett)
2011:  Variations fantômes (Bonsound)
2014:  Ornithologie, la nuit (Bonsound)
2017:  La grande nuit vidéo (Bonsound)

Singles
Les anges dans nos campagnes (2007)
Fille à plumes (cover of a Malajube song 2009 for Bonsound's fifth anniversary)

Videos
Philadelphie (2006)
Archipels (2007)
Je n'irais pas à Bilbao (2008)

References 
Citations

External links 
 Philippe B Official website
 Philippe B at Bonsound Records

Year of birth missing (living people)
Living people
People from Rouyn-Noranda
Canadian male singer-songwriters
Canadian singer-songwriters
French-language singers of Canada
Singers from Quebec